Malacothrix incana is an uncommon species of flowering plant in the family Asteraceae known by the common name dunedelion. It is endemic to California, where it grows only in sand dunes on the beaches of the Channel Islands and isolated spots along the mainland coastline in San Luis Obispo and Santa Barbara Counties. The type specimen was collected in San Diego, but the plant no longer occurs there.

Description 
This is a perennial herb forming a leafy mound up to about 70 centimeters in maximum height. It may be hairless to densely hairy. The leaves are smooth-edged or have dull lobes. Leaves at the base of the stem are similar to those distal. The inflorescence is an array of flower heads lined with hairless phyllaries. The ray florets are one or two centimeters long and yellow in color.

Taxonomy 
The type specimen was collected in San Diego, probably on the dunes of the Silver Strand on Coronado Island, but the plant is no longer present in San Diego County. The plant was first described as Malacomeris incanus by Thomas Nuttall in 1841, and later as the current name by John Torrey and Asa Gray in 1843.

Distribution and habitat 
This species is a coastal dune endemic, and is only found in the U.S. state of California. Some of the dune habitats it grows in have been damaged. It is found on the mainland in Santa Barbara and San Luis Obispo counties, and also on the Channel Islands of San Miguel, San Nicolas, Santa Cruz, and Santa Rosa. Where dunes transition into areas of normal soil, hybrids with other Malacothrix species may be found.

References

External links
Jepson Manual Treatment
USDA Plants Profile
Photo gallery

incana
Endemic flora of California
Flora without expected TNC conservation status

Taxa named by John Torrey
Taxa named by Asa Gray
Taxa named by Thomas Nuttall